Precious Time is the third studio album by American singer Pat Benatar, released on July 6, 1981, through the Chrysalis label. The album peaked at number one on the United States' Billboard 200, her only album to do so in any country, and was certified as Double Platinum in sales in the US.

Its lead single was the mid-tempo "Fire and Ice", which was a Top 20 hit on the Billboard Hot 100 and a number 2 hit on the Mainstream Rock chart.  It became her largest hit to that point in Canada peaking at number 4 on the RPM Singles Chart but only made the Top 30 in Australia and New Zealand.  The song won Benatar the Grammy Award for Best Female Rock Vocal Performance in 1982.  Precious Times second single, the rapid guitar-driven "Promises in the Dark", one of the few Benatar singles written by her and husband Neil Giraldo, was most successful in France, where it reached number 16, while reaching number 38 on the US Billboard Hot 100 and number 16 on the US Mainstream Rock chart.  It also made the Top 30 in Canada but did not chart in any other countries.

Peaking at number 2, Precious Time was Benatar's third straight Top 3 album in Canada, although its Double Platinum sales certification in that country was less than her first two albums.  It was another major hit for Benatar in France, rising to number 3, and was the first of two number 2 albums she would attain in New Zealand.  It was her first Top 10 album in Australia and Sweden (her only one there) and was her first album to reach the Top 30 in both the United Kingdom and Norway.  The album was remastered and reissued on Capitol Records in 2006.

Record World called the title track a "volatile rocker" and said that "the opening drama explodes with guitar fire."

Track listing

Personnel 
Pat Benatar – lead and backing vocals
Neil Giraldo – lead guitar, keyboards, backing vocals
Scott St. Clair Sheets – rhythm guitar
Roger Capps – bass guitar
Myron Grombacher – drums
Alan Pasqua – piano
Gary Herbig, Joel Peskin, Tom Scott, Larry Williams – saxophones on track 7
Keith Olsen – tambourine on track 2

Production
 Produced by Keith Olsen and Neil Giraldo
 Engineered by Keith Olsen and Chris Minto at Sound City and Goodnight LA
 Mastered by Greg Fulginiti at Artisan Sound Recorders
 Art direction and design by Ria Lewerke-Shapiro

Charts

Weekly charts

Year-end charts

Certifications

References

Bibliography

External links
"Precious Time" at discogs

1981 albums
Pat Benatar albums
Albums produced by Keith Olsen
Chrysalis Records albums
Albums recorded at Sound City Studios